Ferdiansyah Cecep Surya (name order can be reversed, born 15 July 2003) is an Indonesian professional footballer who plays as a winger or attacking midfielder for Liga 1 club Persib Bandung and the Indonesia under-20 team.

Club career

Persib Bandung
He was signed for Persib Bandung to play in Liga 1 in the 2021 season. Ferdiansyah made his first-team debut on 14 December 2022 in a match against Dewa United at the Manahan Stadium, Surakarta.

International career
On 30 May 2022, Ferdi made his debut for an Indonesian youth team against a Venezuela U-20 squad in the 2022 Maurice Revello Tournament in France. In October 2022, it was reported that Kakang received a call-up from the Indonesia U-20 for a training camp, in Turkey and Spain.

Career statistics

Club

Notes

References

External links
 Ferdiansyah Cecep at Soccerway
 Ferdiansyah Cecep at Liga Indonesia

2003 births
Living people
Indonesian footballers
People from Bandung
Sportspeople from West Java
Liga 1 (Indonesia) players
Persib Bandung players
Association football midfielders
Indonesia youth international footballers